Group C is the third of three groups of the 2022 AFC Women's Asian Cup that took place from 21 to 27 February 2022. The group competition consists of Japan, Myanmar, South Korea and Vietnam. The top two teams automatically qualify for the top eight knockout stage, while third place is comparatively evaluated to other third-placed teams based on the football ranking system for the last two berths. The two teams that advanced are Japan and South Korea. Vietnam also made the quarter-finals as they are not comparatively last to the other third-place teams.

Teams

Standings

Matches

Japan vs Myanmar

South Korea vs Vietnam

Myanmar vs South Korea

Vietnam vs Japan

Japan vs South Korea

Vietnam vs Myanmar

Discipline

Fair play points would have been used as tiebreakers in the group if the overall and head-to-head records of teams were tied, or if teams had the same record in the ranking of third-placed teams. These were calculated based on yellow and red cards received in all group matches as follows:

 yellow card = 1 point
 red card as a result of two yellow cards = 3 points
 direct red card = 3 points
 yellow card followed by direct red card = 4 points

References

External links
, the-AFC.com

Group C